This is a list of football (soccer) clubs in Aruba.

 SV Racing Club Aruba
 SV La Fama
 SV Britannia
 SV Bubali
 SV Sportboys
 SV Deportivo Nacional
 SV Dakota
 SV Brazil Juniors
 SV Riverplate
 SV Estrella
 SV Juventud Tanki Leendert
 SV Sporting
 SV Unistars
 SV Independiente Caravel
 SV Jong Aruba
 SV Aparicio Stars
 SV Arsenal
 SV Estudiantes
 SV Trupial
 SV Atlantico
 SV Real Koyari
 SV Independiente Hooiberg
 SV San Luis Deportivo
 FC San Nicolas
 SV Caiquetio
 SV Undesa
 SV CD Rooi Afo
 SV Centro Deportivo Ayo
 SV Arikok
 SV Universal
 SportClubUnited

Aruba
 

Football clubs
Football